Taylor Ridge is a census-designated place (CDP) in Rock Island County, Illinois, United States. Taylor Ridge has a post office with ZIP code 61284.

Demographics

Notable people

 Herb Crompton, MLB catcher, was born in Taylor Ridge in 1911
 Mona Martin, Iowa Legislator and Iowa Women's Hall of Fame inductee, born in Taylor Ridge 1934

References

Unincorporated communities in Rock Island County, Illinois
Unincorporated communities in Illinois